A partial lunar eclipse took place on Saturday, February 21, 1970. It was the first of two partial lunar eclipses in 1970, the other being on August 17 of the same year. A tiny bite out of the Moon may have been visible at maximum, though just 5% of the Moon was shadowed in a partial eclipse which lasted for 52 minutes and 42 seconds. A shading across the moon from the Earth's penumbral shadow should have been visible at maximum eclipse.
Occuring only 2.4 days after apogee (Apogee on Wednesday, February 18, 1970), the Moon's apparent diameter was 6% smaller than average.

Visibility
It was completely visible over eastern Asia, Australia, Pacific, Americas, western Europe, seen rising over northwestern Pacific Ocean and setting over the north Atlantic Ocean.

Relation to other lunar eclipses

Lunar year series

Metonic cycle
This is the third of five Metonic lunar eclipses.

Half-Saros cycle
A lunar eclipse will be preceded and followed by solar eclipses by 9 years and 5.5 days (a half saros). This lunar eclipse is related to two total solar eclipses of Solar Saros 120.

See also
List of lunar eclipses
List of 20th-century lunar eclipses

Notes

External links

1970-02
1970 in science
February 1970 events